Barreta Island (Portuguese: Ilha da Barretta) is an island in Algarve, Portugal, about  long and  wide.

Barreta is also known as Deserta, Deserted Island or Santa Maria Cape Island. Is one of the more isolated islands in Algarve. There is a public ferry line reaching the island everyday, all year round or it can be reached by renting or owning a boat. In this island is located the southernmost point of continental Portugal, Cabo de Santa Maria.

A beach on the island is used by naturists.

See also 
 Cabo de Santa Maria (Faro)

Notes

Islands of the Algarve
Islands of Portugal
Nude beaches
Barrier islands